Parasitic worm, also known as helminth, is large macroparasite.

Parasitic worm may also refer to:
 Acanthocephala, or the spiny-headed worms all of which are parasitic. 
 Hirudinea, extoparasitic annelids commonly known as leeches
 Nematoda, or roundworms the most well known of which are parasitic
 Enterobius, commonly known as pinworms, cause the disease enterobiasis.
 Hookworms, intestinal parasites of mammals. 
 Pentastomida, sometimes referred to as tongue worms which are obligate parasites
 Platyhelminthes, or flatworms the phyla which contains the parasitic tapeworms and flukes. 
 Liver fluke
 Blood fluke
 Lung fluke
 Intestinal fluke

Parasitic worm infection

 Tapeworm infection
 Deworming
 Effects of parasitic worms on the immune system
 Coenurosis, intermediate infection of host
 Coenurosis in humans
 Enterobiasis, pinworm infection
 Echinococcosis, host disease by tapeworm larve
 Helminthiasis, disease caused by any parasitic worm

See also
 Nematomorpha, the horsehair worms are parasitoids not truly parasites.  
 Parasitology, relation between host and parasite
 Human parasites
 Parasitic nutrition, parasite nutrition by feeding off the host
 Ringworm, a fungal infection which causes a ring shaped discoloration in the skin

Helminthiases
Animal common name disambiguation pages